Dr. A. James Kerley is an American academic, and is a former President of Gulf Coast State College in Panama City, Florida. Kerley graduated with his bachelor's degree in social science and history from Tennessee Tech University. He received his master's degree in history from The Citadel and his Doctorate in educational administration from Florida State University. In 2007 he was selected to be the 5th President of then Gulf Coast Community College, and retired in 2014.

Awards
 Commander's Award for Support of Soldiers and Family Members.

References

External links
 President Kerley's official bio
 Newsletter about President Kerley
 Another bio

Living people
Year of birth missing (living people)
Florida State University alumni
The Citadel, The Military College of South Carolina alumni